Fred Alvin Taylor (April 30, 1920 – July 21, 2013) was an American football player and coach. He served as head coach at Texas Christian University from 1967 to 1970, compiling a record of 15–25–1 before he was fired following the 1970 season.

Early life and playing career
Taylor was native of Denison, Texas.  He played college football at Texas Christian University in 1940 and 1941 before entering the United States Army to serve during World War II.  Taylor returned to TCU after the war and served as the football team's captain in 1946.

Death
Taylor died on July 21, 2013.

Head coaching record

College

References

1920 births
2013 deaths
American football ends
TCU Horned Frogs football coaches
TCU Horned Frogs football players
High school football coaches in Texas
United States Army personnel of World War II
People from Denison, Texas
Players of American football from Texas
American United Methodists
20th-century Methodists